The Qin Empire is a 2009 Chinese television series based on Sun Haohui's novel of the same Chinese title, which romanticises the rise of the Qin state in the Warring States period under the leadership of Duke Xiao of Qin. It was produced in 2006 and first aired on television channels in China in December 2009. It was followed by three sequels: The Qin Empire II: Alliance (2012), The Qin Empire III (2017) and The Qin Empire IV (2019), which were also based on Sun Haohui's novels.

Plot
The series is set in the mid fourth century BC during the Warring States period of China. The Qin state in western China has been weakened by years of poverty and internal conflict. It is now in peril of being conquered by the other six major states in the east. Duke Xiao, the new ruler of Qin, seeks to restore his state to its former glory (during Duke Mu's time) and retake the Qin territories lost to the Wei state in earlier battles.

In his quest to recruit talents to assist him, Duke Xiao promises to share Qin with anyone – including foreigners – who could help him realise his grand ambitions. He attracts the attention of Wei Yang, a Legalist searching for opportunities to test his ideas. After discussing for three days and three nights on end, the two men develop a close relationship and work together over the next two decades to push forth a series of groundbreaking sociopolitical reforms in Qin. The reforms transform Qin into a powerful state and helped to lay the foundation for Qin's eventual unification of China under the Qin dynasty nearly 200 years later.

Cast

 Hou Yong as Ying Quliang (Duke Xiao of Qin)
 Wang Zhifei as Wei Yang (Shang Yang)
 Gao Yuanyuan as Bai Xue
 Du Yulu as Gongshu Cuo
 Lü Zhong as the Duchess Dowager of Qin
 Sun Feihu as Gan Long
 Xu Huanshan as Ying Shixi (Duke Xian of Qin)
 You Yong as Pang Juan
 Lee Li-chun as King Hui of Wei
 Lu Yong as Ying Qian
 Qi Fang as Yingyu
 Yu Yang as Jing Jian
 Hou Xiangling as Che Ying
 Jiang Hualin as Heibo
 Lu Ying as Du Zhi
 Qiu Yongli as Gongsun Gu
 Liu Naiyi as Ying Si
 Feng Pengfei as Ying Si (young)
 Guo Changhui as Zi'an
 Chen Zhihui as Hou Ying
 Wang Hui as Prince Ang of Wei
 Yuan Ran as Xuanqi
 Ren Wei as Wang Shi
 Zhao Yang as Meigu
 Jiao Changdao as Meng Che
 Ren Xihong as Xiqi Hu
 Li Zhuo as Bai Jin
 Sun Jiaolong as Jing Nan
 Wu Ma as Baili Yao
 Li Haige as Linghu
 Liu Bingfeng as Gan Cheng
 Liu Mu as Crown Prince Shen of Wei
 Lu Chaofan as Jin Bi
 Jiang Hua as Long Gu
 Zhao Dongbo as Shen Buhai
 Feng Zheng as Shanjia
 Xia Lu as Heya
 Mao Yue as Ying Ji (Chuli Ji)
 Xu Yuting as Bai Tuo
 Li Shide as Shen Dao
 Zhou Yuhua as Qin Guxi
 Wang Yingqi as Denglingzi
 Qian Weidong as Kuhuo
 Jin Ming as Zhao Kang
 Zhang Bingqi as Zhao Liang
 Ji Chen as King Wei of Qi
 Dong Qiming as Sun Bin
 Mei Shengxiang as Bian Que
 Unknown as Zhang Yi

List of featured songs
 Dafeng Qi Xi Yun Feiyang (大风起兮云飞扬; A Great Wind Comes Forth and the Clouds Rise High) performed by Liao Changyong and Tan Jing.
 Jiujiu Laoqin (赳赳老秦; Grand Old Qin) performed by the China Philharmonic Orchestra.
 Xiang'ai Gengzhi (相爱耕织; Sowing Mutual Love) performed by Lei Jia.
 Fenghua Juedai (风华绝代; Magnificent and Peerless) performed by Tan Jing.

Awards
The series won the Flying Goddess Award and the Golden Eagle Prize for the Best TV Drama.

International broadcast

External links
  The Qin Empire official website
  The Qin Empire on Sina.com

2009 Chinese television series debuts
Television series set in the Zhou dynasty
Television shows based on Chinese novels
Chinese historical television series
Television shows set in Xi'an
The Qin Empire (TV series)
Television series set in the 4th century BC